Danghara, is a town in the Khatlon Region of Tajikistan. It is the capital of Danghara District. Danghara is the hometown of Tajikistan's President, Emomali Rahmon as well as the country's first Deputy Prime Minister, Asadullo Ghulomov, and a number of other senior government officials and members of parliament. The population of the town is 31,100 (January 2020 estimate). In 2012, Radio Free Europe reported that the town might be the target of a plan to relocate the country's capital city.

Development and rumors of the city as the new national capital
As of January 2012 ongoing construction of a new international airport, rerouting of a major rail line, complete renovation of the town's roads and extensive building construction had spurred rumors that Danghara might become the nation's new capital city.

2018 terrorist attack
In 2018, 4 cyclists were killed near Danghara in a terrorist attack.

Climate
Danghara has a hot-summer Mediterranean climate (Köppen climate classification Csa).

Population

References

Populated places in Khatlon Region